Lamin Fofana is an electronic music producer, DJ, and artist. Fofana grew up in Sierra Leone and Guinea before moving to the United States when he was a teenager. 

With a repertoire consisting of instrumental electronic, experimental, ambient and techno music, Fofana explores themes of displacement, identity and immigration, drawing inspiration from his own life and the migrant experience at large. Fofana spent most of his early childhood in Freetown, Sierra Leone until the civil war of the 1990s forced his family to flee to Guinea.  When he was just a teenager, his family relocated once more to the United States where he split his time between Harlem, New York and Alexandria, Virginia. This move to the west and its inherent unfamiliarities shaped his understanding of the world at an impressionable age, pushing him to explore more experimental forms of artistic expression to give voice to his experiences and those of people like him. The artist’s eclectic music is also greatly influenced by the diverse musical styles he was exposed to as he moved from one location to the next.

He began producing music at the age of 16 years and progressed to DJing a few years later. His debut EP, What Elijah Said, was released in 2010, while his music label, Sci-Fi & Fantasy, was founded in 2012. Sci-Fi & Fantasy is known for representing Berlin based artist Lotic and New York City based artists Max McFerren and Lou DiBenedetto's Headlock project. Fofana has released a series of albums and has exhibited artistic installations and debuted performances of original compositions at various events including WITNESS at the 57th Venice Biennale, Italy (2017), Refracted Gazes/Fugitive Dreams at Akademie Schloss Solitude, Stuttgart, Germany (2019), BLUES  at Mishkin Gallery at Baruch College, The City University of New York (2020), Life and Death by Water for the Liverpool Biennial 2021 at Lewis's Building, Liverpool, England, a call to disorder at Haus der Kunst, Munich, Germany (2021), and the Preis der Nationalgalerie group exhibition at Hamburger Bahnhof, Berlin, Germany (2021).  His releases include Black Metamorphosis, Darkwater, and Blues (an album trilogy).

Discography

References

Living people
Year of birth missing (living people)